Timothy W. Coulis (born February 24, 1958) is a Canadian retired ice hockey forward.

Career
Coulis was selected 18th overall by the Washington Capitals in the 1978 NHL Entry Draft. He would play just 19 games with the Capitals and spent most of his tenure with the team in the minor leagues. Coulis also played 28 games for the Minnesota North Stars over three seasons between 1983 and 1986.

External links

Profile at hockeydraftcentral.com

1958 births
Living people
Canadian ice hockey forwards
Dallas Black Hawks players
Hamilton Fincups players
Hershey Bears players
Ice hockey people from Ontario
Kalamazoo Wings (1974–2000) players
Minnesota North Stars players
National Hockey League first-round draft picks
Salt Lake Golden Eagles (CHL) players
Sportspeople from Kenora
Sault Ste. Marie Greyhounds players
Springfield Indians players
Washington Capitals draft picks
Washington Capitals players